Silvio Gabriel Rudman (born May 3, 1969 in Buenos Aires, Argentina) is an Argentinean football manager and former player. He is currently manager for Liga Nacional club Sololá.

External links
 
 

1969 births
Living people
Argentine footballers
Argentine expatriate footballers
Argentine Primera División players
Segunda División B players
Serie B players
Liga MX players
Argentinos Juniors footballers
Club Atlético Independiente footballers
Boca Juniors footballers
C.D. Veracruz footballers
Atlas F.C. footballers
Calcio Padova players
Elche CF players
C.D. Marathón players
Columbus Crew players
Deportivo Zacapa players
Club San José players
Yokohama F. Marinos players
Expatriate footballers in Spain
Expatriate footballers in Italy
Expatriate footballers in Mexico
Expatriate footballers in Honduras
Expatriate footballers in Guatemala
Expatriate footballers in Bolivia
Expatriate footballers in Japan
Expatriate soccer players in the United States
Argentine football managers
Footballers from Buenos Aires
Association football forwards
Major League Soccer players
Monagas S.C. managers